Animal Kingdom may refer to:

Animals
 Animal or the Kingdom Animalia, a classification of living organisms
 Animal Kingdom (horse), winner of the 2011 Kentucky Derby

Places
 Disney's Animal Kingdom, a theme park at Walt Disney World, Florida, U.S.
 Animal Kingdom Resort Area, a group of resorts near the theme park

Arts, entertainment, and media

Films
 The Animal Kingdom, a 1932 American comedy-drama film based on the 1932 play
 One More Tomorrow (film), an alternate title for the 1946 remake of the 1932 film
 Animal Kingdom (film), a 2010 Australian crime film
 Animal Kingdom: Let's Go Ape, a 2013 Belgian-French-Italian CGI-animated film

Literature
 Animal Kingdom, A Crime Story, a 2010 novel by Stephen Sewell, based on the 2010 Australian film
 The Animal Kingdom, a 1932 play by Philip Barry
 The Animal Kingdom, a 2018 book by Randal Ford

Music
 Animal Kingdom (band), a UK indie rock band
 Animal Kingdom, a 2008 album by Baseball
 Animal Kingdom, a 2010 album by Raptile
Animal Kingdom, a 2019 album by Cavetown

Television
 Animal Kingdom (TV series), an American television series on TNT inspired by the Australian film
 Animal Kingdom, original title of the American TV series Animal World
 , or Kingdom of Animals, a documentary program on the Korean Broadcasting System

See also

Animal World (disambiguation)
Wild kingdom (disambiguation)
Wild Kingdom, an American television show that features wildlife and nature
"Kingdom of the Animals", a song by Iron & Wine from the album Around the Well
 
 Kingdom (disambiguation)
 Animal (disambiguation)